The Albany metropolitan area may refer to:

The Albany, Georgia metropolitan area, United States
The Albany, New York metropolitan area, United States, also known as the Capital District
The Albany, Oregon metropolitan area, United States

See also
Albany (disambiguation)